The Stranger, also published in English as The Outsider, is a 1942 novella written by French author Albert Camus. The first of Camus' novels published in his lifetime, the story follows Meursault, an indifferent settler in French Algeria, who, weeks after his mother's funeral, kills an unnamed Arab man in Algiers. The story is divided into two parts, presenting Meursault's first-person narrative before and after the killing.  

Camus completed the initial manuscript by May 1941, with revisions were suggested by André Malraux, Jean Paulhan, and Raymond Queneau and later adopted in the final version. The original French-language first edition of the novella was published on May 19, 1942, by Gallimard, under its original title; it appeared in bookstores from that June but was restricted to an initial 4,400 copies, so few that it could not be a bestseller. Published during the Nazi occupation of France, it went on sale without censorship or omission by the Propaganda-Staffel.

It began being published in English from 1946, first in the United Kingdom, where its title was changed to avoid confusion with the translation of Maria Kuncewiczowa's novel of the same name; after being published in the United States, the novella retained its original name, and the British-American difference in titles has persisted in subsequent editions. The Stranger gained popularity among anti-Nazi circles following its focus in Jean-Paul Sartre's 1947 article "Explication de L'Étranger.

Considered a classic of 20th-century literature, The Stranger has received critical acclaim for Camus' philosophical outlook, absurdism, syntatic structure, and existentialism (despite Camus' rejection of the label), particularly within its final chapter. Le Monde ranked The Stranger as number one on its 100 Books of the 20th Century. The novella has twice been adapted for film: Lo Straniero (1967) and Yazgı (2001), has seen numerous references and homages in television and music (notably "Killing an Arab" by The Cure) and was retold from the perspective of the unnamed Arab man in Kamel Daoud's 2013 novel The Meursault Investigation.

Plot

Part 1
Meursault learns of the death of his mother, who has been living in an old age home in the country. He takes time off from work to attend her funeral, but he shows no signs of grief or mourning that the people around him expect from someone in his situation. When asked if he wishes to view her body, he declines, and he smokes and drinks regular (white) coffee—not the obligatory black coffee—at the vigil held by his mother's coffin the night before the burial. Most of his comments to the reader at this time are about his observations of the aged attendees at the vigil and funeral, which takes place on an unbearably hot day.

Back in Algiers, Meursault encounters Marie, a former secretary of his firm. The two become re-acquainted, swim together, watch a comedy film, and begin to have an intimate relationship. All of this happens on the day after his mother's funeral.

Over the next few days, Meursault helps Raymond Sintès, a neighbor and friend who is rumored to be a pimp, but says he works in a warehouse, to get revenge on a Moorish girlfriend he suspects has been accepting gifts and money from another man. Raymond asks Meursault to write a letter inviting the girl over to Raymond's apartment solely so that he can have sex with her and then spit in her face and throw her out. While he listens to Raymond, Meursault is characteristically unfazed by any feelings of empathy, so he does not express concern that Raymond's girlfriend would be emotionally hurt by this plan and agrees to write the letter. In general, Meursault considers other people either interesting or annoying, or feels nothing for them at all.

Raymond's girlfriend visits him on a Sunday morning, and the police get involved when he beats her for slapping him after he tries to kick her out. He asks Meursault to testify that the girlfriend had been unfaithful when he is called to the police station, to which Meursault agrees. Ultimately, Raymond is let off with a warning.

While this is going on, Meursault's boss asks him if he would like to work at a branch their firm is thinking about opening in Paris and Marie asks him if he wants to get married. In both cases, Meursault says that he does not have strong feelings about the matter, but he is willing to move or get married if it will please the other party. Also, Salamano, Meursault and Raymond's curmudgeonly old neighbor, loses his abused and diseased dog and, though he mostly outwardly maintains his usual spiteful and uncaring attitude toward the creature, he goes to Meursault for comfort and advice a few times. During one of these conversations, Salamano, who says he adopted the dog as a companion shortly after his wife's death, mentions that some neighbors had 'said nasty things' about Meursault after he sent his mother to a retirement home. Meursault is surprised to learn about this negative impression of his actions.

One weekend, Raymond invites Meursault and Marie to a friend's beach cabin. There they see the brother of Raymond's spurned girlfriend along with another Arab, who Raymond has mentioned have been following him around recently. The Arabs confront Raymond and his friend, and the brother wounds Raymond with a knife before running away. Later, Meursault walks back along the beach alone, armed with a revolver he took from Raymond to prevent him from acting rashly, and encounters the brother of Raymond's girlfriend. Disoriented and on the edge of heatstroke, Meursault shoots when the Arab flashes his knife at him. It is a fatal shot, but Meursault shoots the man four more times after a pause. He does not divulge to the reader any specific reason for this act or what he feels, other than being bothered by the heat and intensely bright sunlight.

Part 2
Meursault is now incarcerated. His general detachment and ability to adapt to any external circumstance seem to make living in prison tolerable, especially after he gets used to the idea of being restricted and unable to have sex with Marie, though he does realize at one point that he has been unknowingly talking to himself for a number of days. For almost a year, he sleeps, looks out the small window of his cell, and mentally lists the objects in his old apartment while he waits for his day in court.

Meursault never denies that he killed the Arab, so, at his trial, the prosecuting attorney focuses more on Meursault's inability or unwillingness to cry at his mother's funeral than on the details of the murder. He portrays Meursault's quietness and passivity as demonstrating his criminality and lack of remorse and denounces Meursault as a soul-less monster who deserves to die for his crime. To the reader, Meursault acknowledges that he has never felt regret for any of his actions because, he says, he has always been too absorbed in the present moment. Although several of Meursault's friends testify on his behalf and his attorney tells him the sentence will likely be light, Meursault is sentenced to be publicly decapitated.

Put in a new cell, Meursault obsesses over his impending doom and appeal and tries to imagine some way in which he can escape his fate. He repeatedly refuses to see the prison chaplain, but one day the chaplain visits him anyway. Meursault says he does not believe in God and is not even interested in the subject, but the chaplain persists in trying to lead Meursault away from atheism (or, perhaps more precisely, apatheism). The chaplain believes Meursault's appeal will succeed in getting him released from prison, but says such an outcome will not get rid of his feelings of guilt or fix his relationship with God. Eventually, Meursault accosts the chaplain in a rage. He attacks the chaplain's worldview and patronizing attitude and asserts that, in confronting the certainty of the nearness of his death, he has had insights about life and death that he feels with a confidence beyond what the chaplain possesses. He says that, although what we say or do or feel can cause our deaths to happen at different times or under different circumstances, none of those things can change the fact that we are all condemned to die one day, so nothing ultimately matters.

After the chaplain leaves, Meursault finds some comfort in thinking about the parallels between his situation and how he thinks his mother must have felt when she was surrounded by death and slowly dying at the retirement home. Yelling at the chaplain had emptied him of all hope or thoughts of escape or a successful appeal, so he is able to open his heart 'to the benign indifference of the universe,' after which he decides that he has been, and still is, happy. His final assertion is that a large, hateful crowd at his execution will end his loneliness and bring everything to a consummate end.

Characters 
 Meursault is a French settler in Algeria who learns of his mother's death by telegram. Meursault's indifference to his mother's death demonstrates some emotional detachment from his environment. Other instances are shown. Meursault is also a truthful person, speaking his mind without regard for others. He is estranged from society due to his indifference but shows some affection towards Marie. 
 Meursault's mother was sent to an old people's home three years prior to her death, as noted in the opening lines of the novel. As Meursault nears the time for his execution, he feels a kinship with his mother, thinking she, too, embraced a meaningless universe.
 Thomas Pérez was the fiancé of Meursault's mother while she was in the home. He brings up the rear in the funeral procession for Meursault's mother, and Meursault describes in a great amount of detail the old man's struggle to keep up. He is called to testify at Meursault's trial.
 Céleste is the owner of a café that Meursault frequents. He testifies at Meursault's trial.
 Marie Cardona was a typist in the same workplace as Meursault. A day after his mother's funeral, she meets Meursault at a public pool, and they begin a relationship. She asks Meursault on one occasion if he loves her, and on another if he would like to marry her. To the first he responds with no, the second he seems indifferent to the idea. Marie visits him once in prison, but is not permitted any further visits since she is not his wife. She testifies at Meursault's trial.
 Salamano is an old man who routinely walks his dog. He abuses it but is still attached to it. When he loses his dog, he is distressed and asks Meursault for advice. He testifies at Meursault's trial.
 Raymond Sintès is a neighbour of Meursault who beats his Arab mistress. Her brother and friends try to take revenge. He brings Meursault into the conflict, and the latter kills the brother. Raymond and Meursault seem to develop a bond, and he testifies for Meursault during his trial.
 Masson is the owner of the beach house where Raymond takes Marie and Meursault. Masson is a carefree person who likes to live his life and be happy. He testifies at Meursault's trial.
 The Arabs include Raymond's mistress, her brother, and his assumed friends. None of the Arabs in The Stranger are named, reflecting the distance between the French colonists and native people.
 The Arab (the brother of the mistress of Raymond) is a man shot and killed by Meursault on a beach in Algiers.

Critical analysis
In his 1956 analysis of the novel, Carl Viggiani wrote:

Victor Brombert has analysed L'Étranger and Sartre's "Explication de L'Étranger" in the philosophical context of the Absurd. Louis Hudon dismissed the characterisation of L'Étranger as an existentialist novel in his 1960 analysis. The 1963 study by Ignace Feuerlicht begins with an examination of the themes of alienation, in the sense of Meursault being a 'stranger' in his society. In his 1970 analysis, Leo Bersani commented that L'Étranger is "mediocre" in its attempt to be a "'profound' novel", but describes the novel as an "impressive if flawed exercise in a kind of writing promoted by the New Novelists of the 1950s". Paul P. Somers Jr. has compared Camus's L'Étranger and Sartre's Nausea, in light of Sartre's essay on Camus's novel. Sergei Hackel has explored parallels between L'Étranger and Dostoyevsky's Crime and Punishment.

Terry Otten has studied in detail the relationship between Meursault and his mother. Gerald Morreale examines Meursault's killing of the Arab and the question of whether Meursault's action is an act of murder. Ernest Simon has examined the nature of Meursault's trial in L'Étranger, with respect to earlier analysis by Richard Weisberg and jurist Richard A. Posner. René Girard has critiqued the relative nature of 'indifference' in the character of Meursault in relation to his surrounding society.

Kamel Daoud has written a novel The Meursault Investigation (2013/2014), first published in Algeria in 2013, and then republished in France to critical acclaim. This post-colonialist response to The Stranger counters Camus's version with elements from the perspective of the unnamed Arab victim's brother (naming him and presenting him as a real person who was mourned) and other protagonists. Daoud explores their subsequent lives following the withdrawal of French authorities and most pied-noirs from Algeria after the conclusion of the Algerian War of Independence in 1962.

Publication history and English translations

Original French publication 
On 27 May 1941, Camus was informed about the changes suggested by André Malraux after he had read the manuscript and took his remarks into account. For instance, Malraux thought the minimalist syntactic structure was too repetitive. Some scenes and passages (the murder, the conversation with the chaplain) should also be revised.
The manuscript was then read by editors Jean Paulhan and Raymond Queneau. Gerhard Heller, a German editor, translator and lieutenant in the Wehrmacht working for the Censorship Bureau offered to help.

The original French-language novel was published on May 19, 1942 in Paris by Gallimard as L' Étranger. The book started appearing in bookstores in June 1942; only 4,400 copies of it were printed.

English translations 
In 1946, the novel was translated into English for the first time by British author Stuart Gilbert; for more than 30 years his version was the standard English translation. Gilbert's choice of title, The Stranger, was changed by Hamish Hamilton to The Outsider, because they considered it "more striking and appropriate" and because Maria Kuncewiczowa's Polish-language novel Cudzoziemka had recently been published in London as The Stranger. In the United States, Knopf had already typeset the manuscript using Gilbert's original title when informed of the name change and so disregarded it; the British–American difference in titles has persisted in subsequent editions.

In 1982, the British publisher Hamish Hamilton, which had issued Gilbert's translation, published a translation by Joseph Laredo, also as The Outsider. Penguin Books bought this version in 1983 for a paperback edition.

In 1988, Vintage published a version in the United States with a translation by American Matthew Ward under the standard American title of The Stranger. Camus was influenced by American literary style, and Ward's translation expresses American usage.

In 2012, a newer translation by Sandra Smith was published by Penguin as The Outsider

Difference between translations 
A critical difference among these translations is the expression of emotion in the sentence towards the close of the novel: "I laid my heart open to the benign indifference of the universe" in Gilbert's translation, versus Laredo's "I laid my heart open to the gentle indifference of the universe" (literally, "the tender indifference of the world"). The Penguin Classics 2000 reprint of Laredo's translation has "gentle" changed to "benign".

The ending lines differ as well: Gilbert translates "on the day of my execution there should be a huge crowd of spectators and that they should greet me with howls of execration", which contrasts with Laredo's translation of "greet me with cries of hatred." This passage describes a scene that would serve as a foil to the prior "indifference of the world". Ward translates this as "with cries of hate". Gilbert juxtaposes "execration" with "execution".

 is the opening sentence of the novel. English translations have rendered the first sentence as 'Mother died today', 'Maman died today', or a variant thereof. In 2012, Ryan Bloom argued that it should be translated as 'Today, Maman died.' He believes this better expresses the character of Meursault, as developed in the novel, as someone who 'lives for the moment', 'does not consciously dwell on the past', and 'does not worry about the future'.

List of English translations 

 1946, The Outsider (translated by Stuart Gilbert), London: Hamish Hamilton
 1946, The Stranger (translated by Stuart Gilbert), New York: Alfred A. Knopf
 1982, The Outsider (translated by Joseph Laredo), London: Hamish Hamilton, 
 1989, The Stranger (translated by Matthew Ward), New York: Vintage, 
 2012, The Outsider (translated by Sandra Smith), London: Penguin,

Adaptations and allusions

Film adaptations/allusions

Direct adaptations 
 1967 Lo Straniero by Luchino Visconti (Italian)
 2001 Yazgı (Fate) by Zeki Demirkubuz (Turkish)

Allusions 
 1990 American psychological horror film  Jacob's Ladder. In the first scene where Jacob finds himself no longer fighting in the jungles of Vietnam, he is on a subway train reading The Stranger.
 2001 The Man Who Wasn't There by The Coen Brothers
 2014 The Gambler
 2015 Mad Men – Season 7 – Episode 12 – Ending

Literature
 The Meursault Investigation (2015) by Kamel Daoud is a novel created counter to Camus's version, from the perspective of an Arab man described as the brother of the murdered man. Referred to only as "The Arab" by Camus, in this novel he is said to have been named Musa, and was an actual man who existed and was mourned by his brother and mother. It was a New York Times Notable Book of 2015.
 In Camus’ "The Plague", published in 1948, Camus mentions a woman who "started airing her views about a murder case that had created some stir in Algiers. A young commercial employee had killed an Algerian on a beach".

In song
 "Killing an Arab", the 1979 debut single by the Cure, was described by Robert Smith as "a short poetic attempt at condensing my impression of the key moments in 'l'entranger' (The Outsider) by Albert Camus".
 "Noch koroche dnya", from the 1995 album of the same name by the Russian heavy metal band Aria, is based on Meursault's encounter with the chaplain in the final scene of the novel. It is narrated from Meursault's first-person perspective and includes (in Russian) the line, "The cries of hate will be my reward / Upon my death, I will not be alone".
 At the end of "Asa Phelps Is Dead", from the album Ghost Stories by The Lawrence Arms, the passage in which Meursault accepts his impending execution is read by Chris McCaughan. It parallels certain themes in the song's lyrics.
 Folk singer-songwriter Eric Andersen has a song called "The Stranger (Song of Revenge)", one of four songs based on Camus's works on his 2014 EP The Shadow and Light of Albert Camus.
 Tuxedomoon's third single was titled "The Stranger" and was reworked in 1981 as "L'étranger (Gigue existentielle)" for the Suite en sous-sol EP. The lyrics to both versions include direct references to the protagonist's mother's death and the expectation that he cry at her funeral.

See also

 Absurdism
 Existentialism
 Character evidence
 La Veuve Couderc
 Le Mondes 100 Books of the Century

References

External links

 
 L'Étranger, ebooksgratuits.com ; HTML format, public domain in Canada
 The Stranger data visualization and learning guide from LitCharts.

1942 French novels
Novels by Albert Camus
Absurdist fiction
Books with atheism-related themes
French philosophical novels
Novels set in Algeria
Éditions Gallimard books
French novels adapted into films
First-person narrative novels
Novels adapted into comics